Eugene Edward Campbell (August 17, 1932 – April 8, 2013) was an American ice hockey player. He played for the Minnesota Golden Gophers. He won a silver medal with the United States national team at the 1956 Winter Olympics. He was born in Minneapolis, Minnesota and died at Lake Minnetonka Shores in Spring Park, Minnesota.

Campbell and Ken Johannson were the inaugural coaches for the Rochester Lourdes High School boys' hockey program.

Awards and honors

References

1932 births
2013 deaths
American men's ice hockey forwards
Ice hockey people from Minneapolis
Ice hockey players at the 1956 Winter Olympics
Medalists at the 1956 Winter Olympics
Minnesota Golden Gophers men's ice hockey players
Olympic silver medalists for the United States in ice hockey
South High School (Minnesota) alumni